Mindaugas Ežerskis (born 2 August 1977 in Tauragė) is a three-time Olympic wrestler from Lithuania, who competed for the heavyweight division and wrestling coach. He also won the bronze medal for his category at the 2005 European Wrestling Championships in Varna, Bulgaria, and silver at the 2007 World Wrestling Championships in Baku, Azerbaijan, losing out to Georgia's Ramaz Nozadze.

At the Olympics, Ežerskis was eliminated in a pool of wrestlers for the heavyweight division in Sydney, and in Athens. With his poor Olympic performance at two previous games, he managed to improve his skills, tactics, and training, and fought successfully against his opponents at various wrestling tournaments. After winning a silver medal at the World Championships in 2007, Ežerskis received an automatic qualifying place at the 2008 Summer Olympics in Beijing, and competed for the men's under-96 kg category in Greco-Roman wrestling. He was eliminated in the first official round of the competition, after being defeated by Russia's Aslanbek Khushtov, with a technical score of 1–3. Because his opponent advanced successfully into the final round, Ežerskis automatically qualified for the bronze medal bouts by competing in the repechage round. However, he was lost to Kazakhstan's Asset Mambetov, with a technical score of 4–5, finishing only in seventh place.

Ežerskis is currently one of the coaches of the national Greco-Roman wrestling team.

References

External links 
 
 
 
 
  
 

1977 births
Living people
Wrestlers at the 2000 Summer Olympics
Lithuanian male sport wrestlers
Wrestlers at the 2004 Summer Olympics
Wrestlers at the 2008 Summer Olympics
Olympic wrestlers of Lithuania
Lithuanian wrestling coaches
World Wrestling Championships medalists
European Wrestling Championships medalists
21st-century Lithuanian people